The Croatia women's national tennis team represents Croatia in Fed Cup tennis competition and are governed by the Croatian Tennis Association.  They currently compete in the Europe/Africa Zone Group I.

History
Prior to 1992 see Yugoslavia Fed Cup team

Croatia competed in its first Fed Cup in 1992 and qualified for the first time in World Group in 1993. They reached the Quarterfinals in 2002.

Current team
The following players were called up for the 2022 Billie Jean King Cup Play-offs match against Germany in November 2022.

Players

Managers

Recent performances
Here is the list of all match-ups since 1992, when Croatia started competing as a separate nation.

1990s

2000s

2010s

2020s

Statistics
Since 1992 (Last updated: Croatia – Germany ; 12 November 2022)

Record
Champion: 0 times 
Runner-up: 0 times
Lost in Semifinals: 0 times
Lost in Quarterfinals: 1 time
Lost in First Round: 6 times (including pool stage in 2000)
Not in World Group: 14 times
Total: 55–43 (56.1%)

Head-to-head record (1992–)

Record against continents

Record by decade
2020–2029: 6–4 (60.0%) 
2010–2019: 21–18 (53.8%) 
2000–2009: 9–13 (40.9%)
1992–1999: 19–8 (70.4%)

Has never played against 22 countries which, at one point or another, played in the World Group: Australia, Canada, China, Colombia, Dominican Republic, Ecuador, Egypt, Finland, France, Hong Kong, Indonesia, Iran, Mexico, Morocco, New Zealand, Norway, Paraguay, Peru, Philippines, Slovakia, South Korea, Uruguay.

Notes

External links

Billie Jean King Cup teams
Fed Cup
Fed Cup
1992 establishments in Croatia